Myanzi is a small town in the Central Region of Uganda.

Location
The coordinates of Myanzi are 0°26'15.0"N, 31°54'38.0"E (Latitude:0.437501; Longitude:31.910547).

Overview
The Myanzi–Kassanda–Bukuya–Kiboga Road meets the Mityana–Mubende Road at a T-junction in the middle of town.

See also
 Mityana–Mubende Road
 Myanzi–Kassanda–Bukuya–Kiboga Road

External links
Farmers Access Improved Bean Seed In Bulk, For The First Time: Myanzi and Kitumbi Area Cooperative Enterprises in Central Uganda - 7 March 2014

References

Populated places in Central Region, Uganda
Cities in the Great Rift Valley
Mubende District